The Northern Virginia Criminal Justice Training Academy is a law enforcement training facility located in Ashburn, Virginia. It serves 17 agencies in Virginia and Washington, D.C., and is accredited by the Commission on Accreditation for Law Enforcement Agencies (CALEA). It offers training for entry-level police officers, sheriff's deputies, and 9-1-1 dispatchers; as well as advanced training for veteran officers in subjects such as identity theft investigations, leadership, and hostage negotiation.

History
The Northern Virginia Criminal Justice Training Academy was established in 1965 as the Northern Virginia Police Academy. In 1971 the Virginia Department of Criminal Justice Services certified the Northern Virginia Police Academy as an approved Training School. The name of the academy was changed to its current name in 1977. In 1993 the Northern Virginia Criminal Justice Training Academy moved from Arlington, Virginia to its present location in Ashburn. The academy was certified by the CALEA in 1995, and re-certified in 1998 and 2001. It was accredited by the CALEA in 2004, and re-accredited in 2007 and 2010. The current executive director is William C. O'Toole.

Staff
The academy staff consists of 17 permanent, non-sworn employees and 18 sworn employees and one non-sworn employee from its member agencies.

Member agencies
Officers from the following seventeen agencies receive their basic training at the academy:
Alexandria Police Department
Alexandria Sheriff's Office
Arlington County Police Department
Arlington County Sheriff's Office
City of Fairfax Police Department
City of Falls Church Police Department
City of Falls Church Sheriff's Office
George Mason University Police Department
Leesburg Police Department
Loudoun County Sheriff's Office
Manassas City Police Department
Manassas Park City Police Department
Middleburg Police Department
Northern Virginia Community College Police
Purcellville Police Department
Washington Metropolitan Area Transit Police
Metropolitan Washington Airports Authority Police

See also
Law enforcement in the United States
List of law enforcement agencies in Virginia
Police academy

References

External links
Northern Virginia Criminal Justice Training Academy Official Website
Virginia Department of Criminal Justice Services

Organizations based in Virginia
1965 establishments in Virginia
Law enforcement in Virginia
Police academies in the United States
Buildings and structures in Loudoun County, Virginia
Educational institutions established in 1965